Luc Crispon is a French lightweight rower. He won a gold medal at the 1985 World Rowing Championships in Hazewinkel with the lightweight men's double scull.

References

Year of birth missing (living people)
Living people
French male rowers
World Rowing Championships medalists for France
20th-century French people